The 2019–20 Dynamo Moscow season was the club's 97th season and third campaign back in the Russian Premier League, following their relegation at the end of the 2015–16 season.

Season events
On 5 October, following a 2–0 away defeat to Orenburg, Dmitri Khokhlov resigned as manager, with Kirill Novikov being appointed as caretaker manager on 8 October. One month later, and Novikov was confirmed as the new permanent manager of Dynamo Moscow.

On 17 March, the Russian Premier League postponed all league fixtures until April 10th due to the COVID-19 pandemic.

On 1 April, the Russian Football Union extended the suspension of football until 31 May.

On 15 May, the Russian Football Union announced that the Russian Premier League season would resume on 21 June.

On 21 June, the Krasnodar vs Dynamo Moscow match scheduled for the same day was postponed until 19 July due to an outbreak of COVID-19 in the Dynamo Moscow squad.

Squad

Out on loan

Transfers

In

Loans in

Out

Loans out

Released

Friendlies

Competitions

Premier League

Results by round

Results

League table

Russian Cup

Squad statistics

Appearances and goals

|-
|colspan="14"|Players away from the club on loan:

|-
|colspan="14"|Players who appeared for Dynamo Moscow but left during the season:

|}

Goal scorers

Clean sheets

Disciplinary record

References

FC Dynamo Moscow seasons
Dynamo Moscow